The Santo Niño de Cebú is a Roman Catholic title of the Child Jesus associated with a religious image of the Christ Child widely venerated as miraculous by Filipino Catholics. It is the oldest Christian artifact in the Philippines, originally a gift from the Spaniard Conquistador Ferdinand Magellan to Rajah Humabon (baptized as Carlos) and his wife and chief consort, Hara Humamay (baptized as Juana) on account of their Christian baptism in 1521.

The dark wood statue measures approximately twelve inches tall, and carved in the Flemish style. It depicts the Child Jesus, with a serene countenance, in the attitude and dress of a Spanish monarch. The statue bears imperial regalia, including a golden crown, globus cruciger, and various sceptres, wears fine vestments, and possesses jewelry mostly offered by devotees over several centuries.

Pope Paul VI granted a decree of Canonical Coronation titled Cunabula Religionis on 27 February 1964, which the coronation was executed on 28 April 1965. The same pontiff later raised its shrine to the status of Minor Basilica on 2 May 1965, via his papal bull Ut Clarificetur to mark the fourth centenary of Christianity in the Philippine Islands.

The image is replicated in various parts of the country with different titles and is one of the most beloved and recognizable Filipino cultural icons. The annual dancing feast of Sinulog is held on the 3rd Sunday of January every year in its honor. Today, the original image is permanently encased behind bulletproof glass inside its chapel within the Basilica del Santo Niño.

History

The Santo Niño de Cebú was originally produced by Flemish artisans, according to a hagiography, based on a vision of Teresa of Ávila, the 16th century Discalced Carmelite mystic.

In early 1521, a Spanish expedition ordered by King Charles V and led by Ferdinand Magellan was on a voyage from Spain to find a westward route to the Spice Islands. After crossing the Atlantic and Pacific Oceans, in 7 April 1521, they landed in Limasawa, Southern Leyte, and met a local ruler named Raja Kulambu, who introduced him to Rajah Humabon, ruler of Cebu Island, and his chief consort, Hara Humamay. On 14 April 1521, Magellan presented them with three gifts: a bust of Christ as the Ecce Homo, an image of the Blessed Virgin Mary, and the Santo Niño as part of their baptism and strategic alliance. As Humabon adopted the Catholic faith, he took the Christian name of "Carlos" (after Charles V), while Humamay was christened "Juana" (after Joanna of Castile, Charles' mother). According to Antonio Pigafetta – Magellan's memoir writer, along with the ruler, about 500 males along with the Queen and 40 women were also converted by Father Valderrama. At the ceremony, Raja Kulambu of Limasawa also converted and was given the name Don "Juan", while his Muslim captain was named Don "Cristobal".

A few days after the mass baptism, Magellan undertook a war expedition on the behalf of the newly named King Carlos, attacking Mactan Island and burning down hamlets which resisted. The residents led by Lapu Lapu defended Magellan's attack with force, and Magellan died on 27 April 1521, in the Battle of Mactan, about three weeks after he had arrived in Philippines. After Magellan's death, his Spanish colleagues left.

The next Spanish expedition arrived on 27 April 1565, again to gain a foothold for a colony to trade spices, and this was led by Miguel López de Legazpi. He attempted a peaceful colonization, but these efforts were rejected. He opened fire on Cebu and burnt the coastal town down destroying 1500 homes and possibly killing 500 people. In the ruins of this destruction, the Spanish mariner Juan Camus found the image of the Santo Niño in a pine box. According to the local legend, the survival of the statue was seen as a sign of miracle by the colonizers, and ever since it has been believed to have miraculous powers.

The image of the Santo Niño is the oldest surviving Catholic relic in the Philippines, along with the Magellan's Cross. A church to house Santo Niño was built on the spot where the image was found by Juan Camus. The church was originally made of bamboo and mangrove palm and claims to be the oldest parish in the Philippines. It was rebuilt later, and Pope Paul VI elevated it to the status of Minor Basilica on its 400th anniversary (Spanish: Basílica Menor del Santo Niño).

Feast

The feast, locally known as Fiesta Señor, starts on the Thursday after the Solemnity of the Epiphany. Each year, the celebration starts with a dawn procession wherein the replica image of Santo Niño de Cebú is brought down to the streets. It is then followed by the novena Masses, which span nine days.

On the last day of the novena, another dawn procession is held wherein the image of Nuestra Señora de Guadalupe de Cebú is removed from its shrine and brought to the Basílica Menor. After the procession, it will stay for a while in the Basilica. Then, the images of Santo Niño de Cebu and Nuestra Señora de Guadalupe de Cebú are brought to the National Shrine of St. Joseph in Mandaue City to be reunited with the icon of the church's namesake, thus forming the Holy Family. This transfer, which is common in fiestas throughout the country, is called Traslación.

On the morning of the vísperas ("eve", i.e., the day before) of the feast, the images of Santo Niño de Cebu and Nuestra Señora de Guadalupe de Cebú are brought back to Cebu City in a fluvial procession that concludes with a reenactment of the first Mass and baptism in the islands. It is then followed by a grand yet solemn foot procession in the afternoon, culminating in a Pontifical Mass concelebrated by bishops and priests. The grand Sinulog Festival is then held on the following Sunday.

The Hubo rite 

The festival officially ends on the Friday after the icon's feast day, and it is marked with the traditional Hubo (Cebuano, "undress") rite. During a Mass, the basilica's priests and sacristans ceremoniously and reverently strip the Santo Niño of its festal vestments and regalia.

There is a strict order of divesting the icon: first the crown is removed, followed by the orb and sceptre; then the cape; then the sash and tunic, and finally, the inner garments. The priest recites a short petition before each removal, which is marked with a festive drum roll. The priest  then chants Christe exaudi nos (Latin for “Christ, graciously hear us”).

The priest then raises the icon for veneration, carefully dips it in a basin of scented water four times, and wipes it dry. He then dresses it in a plainer set of robes, and replaces the regalia in reverse order of divesture. Upon replacing each item, he intones a prayer and leads the congregation in singing the refrain of the Laudes Regiæ: Christus Vincit; Christus Regnat; Christus, Christus Imperat (“Christ Conquers; Christ Reigns; Christ Commands”). Drum rolls then announce the moment as the insignia are worn.

The rite is explained as highlighting Christ's humility, and on the part of the individual believer, it should inspire an internal, spiritual conversion. It was only in 1990 when the Augustinian priests caring for the icon first made the rite public. The Hubo Mass today is held on the Friday following the feast day at the Pilgrim Center outside the Basilica, and the masses following generally mark the termination of the long celebrations.

Pontifical approbations
The original feast date for the image was April 28, but in the 18th century, the following changes were made:
 Pope Innocent XIII moved the date to avoid conflict with the Eastertide. In addition, he approved special liturgical texts for use during the local feast of the Santo Niño in the Philippines, set on the third Sunday of January, followed by the Sinulog festival. 
 Pope Paul VI issued a canonical coronation for the image via the papal bull “Cubanula Religionis” on 28 April 1965, via his Papal legate. Through the papal bull "Ut Clarificetur", the same pontiff raised the sanctuary a Minor Basilica on 2 May 1965.
 Pope John Paul II gave his papal endorsement for the image in his Mass for Families on 1981.
Pope Francis, also endorsed the image and called the Santo Niño "protector" of the Philippines, in his homily at the Rizal Park.

Military honors

During the Spanish colonial era, the Santo Niño was given the high military rank of Captain-General, with the full title of "Celentísimo Capitán General de las Esfuerzas Españolas en Filipinas" (The Most Esteemed Captain-General of the Spanish Forces in the Philippines).  For this reason, the statue is vested in a red cape and sash, symbolising the rank of a general, and military boots.

Presently, the rank is called Celentisimo Capitan General de las Esfuerzas en Filipinas, with the "Españolas" dropped, thusly translating to Most Esteemed Captain-General of the Forces in the Philippines. Further, the image was later honoured by the Philippine Navy with the title "Lord Admiral of the Sea" (Spanish: Señor Almirante de la Mar) during the 446th anniversary of the image's Kaplag ("finding" or "rediscovery") in 2011. This was done in acknowledgment of Christ's "lordship over seafarers, mariners and the marine ecology." The image was taken aboard the naval ship BRP General Emilio Aguinaldo (PG-140) for a fluvial parade, marking the first time its own naval ensign bearing its coat-of-arms was flown by a Philippine naval vessel. The honour was a joint effort of the Naval Forces Central, Philippine Coast Guard-Cebu District, Cebu Ports Authority, Philippine National Police Maritime Group, among others.

Patronage 

The Santo Niño was popularly considered the official patron of Cebu, but the Church in the Philippines suppressed the notion and clarified that it is not the representation of a saint that intercedes to God but rather God in the person of Jesus. Instead, the Archbishop of Cebu, Cardinal Ricardo Vidal, declared Our Lady of Guadalupe of Cebú as the principal patroness of Cebu on 2002.

The devotion to the Santo Niño is common with worldwide veneration of the Infant Jesus of Prague. The image is found in many houses, business establishments, and public transportation. Traditionally, the image is often dressed in one of two colours: red is common for domestic images, while green – symbolising luck – is worn by those enshrined in businesses. It is also often dressed in miniature costumes that often reflect the profession of its devotee such as physicians, nurses, policemen, or teachers. Another popular variation is the Santo Niño de Atocha which in the country is uniquely in a standing pose rather than seated as with the Spanish version.

See also
Black Nazarene
Infant Jesus of Mechelen (Child Jesus of Malines)
Infant Jesus of Prague (Child Jesus of Prague)
Novena

References 

Sto. Nino de Cebu. http://www.malapascua.de/Cebu/Cebu_6__Santo_Nino/cebu_6__santo_nino.html

Statues of the infant Jesus
Catholic Church in the Philippines
Religion in Cebu
Visayan culture
Culture in Cebu City
Catholic devotions